Petras Polekauskas (19 April or 9 May 1909 – 19 April 1965) was a Lithuanian officer of the Lithuanian Army, the Red Army's 29th Rifle Corps and then the Lithuanian Auxiliary Police Battalions formed by Nazi Germany. He is notable for ordering the Glinciszki massacre in June 1944. Initially in the post-war, Polekauskas was a refugee in West Germany due to the Soviet re-occupation of Lithuania in 1944–1945. In the 1950s, he emigrated to USA, where he settled down, created a family and owned a local business in Hartford, Connecticut.

Early life and career 
Polekauskas was born in 1909, either on April 19 or May 9. In his obituary, it is stated that he was born in Marijampolė, although another source gives his birthing place as Vilkaviškis. On 27 August 1931, Polekauskas graduated from the Marijampolė Gymnasium.

On 15 September 1933, Polekauskas graduated from the Cavalry Section of the 15th Class of War School of Kaunas. He served in the 1st Hussar Regiment until 1940. Polekauskas had the rank of sub-lieutenant. He was promoted to lieutenant on 31 December 1936. On 28 September 1937, he joined the Law department of Vytautas Magnus University's Law faculty.

World War II 
On 16 May 1940, Polekauskas was moved to the 2nd Uhlan Regiment and was made commander of the 3rd squadron. When the Soviet Union occupied Lithuania and liquidated its army, Polekauskas was made the commander of the anti-aircraft battery of the Red Army's 29th Territorial Rifle Corps' 26th Cavalry Regiment. When the German-Soviet war started on 22 June 1941, Polekauskas left the Red Army.

During the German occupation of Lithuania during World War II, Polekauskas served in the Lithuanian Auxiliary Police Battalions. During 16-25 July 1941, Polekauskas served in the Vilnius garrison's 2nd Defence Regiment. From August 1941, he commanded one of the three companies of the 15th "Gardinas" Lithuanian Auxiliary Police Battalion. With his company, he was thrown all over Byelorussia and north-eastern Lithuania. From May 1942, Petras Polekauskas was the adjutant of the 254th Lithuanian Auxiliary Police Battalion's commander. In early 1944, based on the unit's surviving orders, it is known that Petras Polekauskas was the commander of the Assembly Company of the 258th Battalion. On 20 June 1944, Petras Polekauskas ordered 50 soldiers, which was roughly half of 3rd Company of the 258th Lithuanian Auxiliary Police Battalion, to commit the Glitiškės massacre.

When a second Bolshevik occupation of Lithuania seemed imminent, Petras Polekauskas fled west to Germany in 1944.

Post-war 
Polekauskas remained in West Germany until 1951, sharing the fate of tens of thousands of refugees from Lithuania. From there, he emigrated to the USA. On 18 February 1951, Polekauskas set sail from the port of Bremerhaven onboard the USNS General Harry Taylor, among a crowd of similar emigrants from Central and Eastern Europe. He arrived in New York on March 3 and settled permanently in Hartford, Connecticut. Polekauskas struggled to settle down in US. He was granted American citizenship on 10 April 1959. In Hartford, Polekauskas met his wife, Alena Levytė-Polekauskienė, also from Lithuania, and started a family. Together, they bought a coffeehouse-cafeteria in 1960 and lived rather well.

Polekauskas was active in Hartford's Lithuanian community, belonged to the local Lithuanian Roman Catholic parish and the local section of the Lithuanian War Veterans' Association (abbreviated as ) "Ramovė".

Death 
Petras Polekauskas died in 1965 April 12 or 19, either Middletown or Hartford, Connecticut. In his obituary, he was described as "pleasant and accommodating" and that we was nostalgically longing for his native land.

Family life 
His wife was Alena Levytė-Polekauskienė, which he met in Hartford. He also had a sister, Marija Stalauskienė, who remained in Lithuania.

References

Bibliography 

 
 
 

1909 births
1965 deaths
People from Marijampolė County
People from Suwałki Governorate
Lithuanian Army officers